Betty Boop's Ker-Choo is a 1932 Fleischer Studios animated short film starring Betty Boop, and featuring Koko the Clown and Bimbo.

Plot
Bimbo and Koko are among the contestants in a big auto race, where all the talking animals in Fleischer-land are in attendance (the "humanized" cars await in stalls like horses, and the judge's panel consists of three elderly blind men). The favorite in the race is Betty Boop, but she's late again, and her Yiddish-accented car has no idea where she is. When Betty finally shows up, she explains in song that her tardiness is due to a "cold in my 'nose'".

Once the race begins, it's a real thriller-spiller, with even the spectators getting into the act—and catching Betty's cold in the process ("Ah, ah, CHOO!)" Eventually, Betty wins the race.

Notes and comments
Betty sings the song "I've Got a Cold in My Nose", written by Scott Bradley with lyrics by Joseph Hanna.

This short was featured in a Cartoon Network video, synced to Soul Coughing's song "Rolling".

References

External links
 Betty Boop's Ker-Choo at IMDB
 Betty Boop's Ker-Choo at the Big Cartoon Database
 Betty Boop's Ker-Choo at YouTube

1933 short films
Betty Boop cartoons
1930s American animated films
American black-and-white films
1933 animated films
Paramount Pictures short films
Fleischer Studios short films
Short films directed by Dave Fleischer
1930s English-language films
American animated short films
Animated films about dogs
Comedy films about clowns
American comedy short films